Ashrita Shetty (born 16 July 1993) is an Indian actress who predominantly works in Tamil language films.

Early life
Shetty was born on 16 July 1993 in a South Indian family from Karnataka. She hails from Mumbai and has studied finance.

Career
In 2010, Shetty participated in a beauty contest organised by The Times of India, Clean & Clear Fresh Face. Competing in Mumbai, she won the event there and then went on to win it again at the national level, eventually becoming the face of the brand for a year. She made her film debut in 2012, with a Tulu film, Telikeda Bolli. During the time, she appeared in various other television commercials. This was when film directors Vetrimaaran and Manimaran approached her to play the lead role in their venture, Udhayam NH4. The film saw her play a Bangalore-based Tamil-speaking college girl, who elopes with the character played by Siddharth. She gained mixed reviews for her portrayal in the film, with a reviewer noting she could be a promising actress in the making. Sangeeta Devi from The Hindu said "Newcomer Ashrita Shetty shows promise and her capability of bringing to the screen the vulnerability and innocence of a 17/18-year-old makes her endearing. This girl has huge potential." She then signed the lead in the action adventure film Indrajith opposite Gautham Karthik.

Personal life
Shetty married Indian cricketer Manish Pandey on 2 December 2019.

Filmography

References

External links 
 
 

1993 births
Living people
Indian film actresses
Tulu people
Actresses in Tulu cinema
Actresses in Tamil cinema
Actresses from Mumbai